Lithuania competed at the 2011 World Aquatics Championships in Shanghai, China between July 16 and 31, 2011.

Diving

Lithuania has qualified 2 athletes in diving.

Men

Swimming

Lithuania has qualified 5 athletes in swimming.

Men

Women

References

Nations at the 2011 World Aquatics Championships
2011 in Lithuanian sport
Lithuania at the World Aquatics Championships